France competed at the 1992 Summer Olympics in Barcelona, Spain. 339 competitors, 241 men and 98 women, took part in 196 events in 25 sports.

Medalists

Competitors
The following is the list of number of competitors in the Games.

Archery

In France's fifth appearance in modern Olympic archery, the individual archers went 7-3 in head-to-head competition, buoyed by Sebastien Flute's 5-0 record as he advanced to the final and won the gold medal.  It was the first medal the French had won in modern Olympic archery.  Both teams won the first two rounds before being defeated in the semifinals.  They also both lost their bronze medal matches.

Women's Individual Competition:
 Severine Bonal — Round of 16 → 9th place (1-1)
 Nathalie Hibon — Round of 32 → 22nd place (0-1)
 Christine Gabillard — Ranking Round → 41st place (0-0)

Men's Individual Competition:
 Sébastien Flute — Final →  Gold Medal (5-0)
 Bruno Felipe — Round of 32 → 21st place (0-1)
 Michael Taupin — Ranking Round → 56th place (0-0)

Women's Team Competition:
 Bonal, Hibon, and Gabillard — Bronze Medal Match → 4th place (2-2)

Men's Team Competition:
 Flute, Felipe, and Taupin — Bronze Medal Match → 4th place (2-2)

Athletics

Men's 100 metres
Max Morinière
Daniel Sangouma

Men's 200 metres
Gilles Quénéhervé
Jean-Charles Trouabal

Men's 800 metres
Frédéric Cornette

Men's 5,000 metres
Pascal Thiebault
 Heat — 13:31.16
 Final — 13:43.39 (→ 13th place)

Men's 10,000 metres
António Martins Bordelo
 Heat — 28:35.13
 Final — 28:47.66 (→ 15th place)
Thierry Pantel
 Heat — did not finish (→ no ranking)

Men's 4 × 400 m Relay
Jean-Louis Rapnouil, Yann Quentrec, Stéphane Caristan, and Stéphane Diagana
 Heat — 3:04.25 (→ did not advance)

Men's Marathon
 Dominique Chauvelier — 2:19.09 (→ 31st place)
 Luis Soares — 2:21.57 (→ 45th place)
 Pascal Zilliox — 2:30.02 (→ 64th place)

Men's 400m Hurdles
Stéphane Diagana
 Heat — 48.41
 Semifinal — 48.28
 Final — 48.13 (→ 4th place)
Stéphane Caristan
 Heat — 49.16
 Semifinal — 49.50
 Final — 48.86 (→ 7th place)

Men's 110m Hurdles
 Sébastien Thibault 
 Heats — 13.94 (→ did not advance)

Men's 20 km Walk
Thierry Toutain — DSQ (→ no ranking)

Men's 50 km Walk
René Piller — 4:02:40 (→ 15th place)
Alain Lemercier — 4:06:31 (→ 16th place)
Martial Fesselier — 4:07:30 (→ 17th place)

Men's Long Jump
Serge Helan
 Qualification — 7.60 m (→ did not advance)
Franck Lestage
 Qualification — 7.72 m (→ did not advance)

Men's Triple Jump
Pierre Camara
 Qualification — 17.34 m
 Final — 16.52 m (→ 11th place)
Georges Sainte-Rose
 Qualification — 16.50 m (→ did not advance)
Serge Helan
 Qualification — 16.47 m (→ did not advance)

Men's Hammer Throw
Christophe Épalle 
 Qualification — 76.24 m
 Final — 74.84 m (→ 10th place)
Raphaël Piolanti 
 Qualification — 73.22 m (→ did not advance)
Frédéric Kuhn 
 Qualification — 71.76 m (→ did not advance)

Women's 100 metres
Patricia Girard-Léno
Odiah Sidibé
Laurence Bily

Women's 200 metres
Valérie Jean-Charles
Maguy Nestoret

Women's 400 metres
Marie-José Pérec
Elsa Devassoigne

Women's 800 metres
Viviane Dorsile
 Heat — 2:01.54 (→ did not advance)

Women's 10.000 metres
Annette Sergent-Palluy
 Heat — 32:57.29 (→ did not advance)
 Rosario Murcia
 Heat — 33:16.96 (→ did not advance)

Women's Marathon
 Maria Rebelo — did not finish (→ no ranking)

Women's High Jump
 Sandrine Fricot 
 Qualification — 1.90 m (→ did not advance)

Badminton

Boxing

Canoeing

Cycling

18 cyclists, 14 men and 4 women, represented France in 1992. Jeannie Longo won silver in the women's road race and the men won bronze in the team time trial.

Men's road race
 Sylvain Bolay
 Pascal Hervé
 Emmanuel Magnien

Men's team time trial
 Hervé Boussard
 Didier Faivre-Pierret
 Philippe Gaumont
 Jean-Louis Harel

Men's sprint
 Frédéric Magné

Men's 1 km time trial
 Frédéric Lancien

Men's individual pursuit
 Philippe Ermenault

Men's team pursuit
 Hervé Dagorné
 Philippe Ermenault
 Daniel Pandèle
 Pascal Potié

Men's points race
 Éric Magnin

Women's road race
 Jeannie Longo — 2:05:02 (→  Silver Medal)
 Catherine Marsal — 2:05:03 (→ 21st place)
 Marion Clignet — 2:05:13 (→ 33rd place)

Women's sprint
 Félicia Ballanger

Women's individual pursuit
 Jeannie Longo

Diving

Men's 3m Springboard
Philippe Duvernay
 Preliminary Round — 310.14 points (→ did not advance, 29th place)

Men's 10m Platform
Frédéric Pierre
 Preliminary Round — 329.01 (→ did not advance, 19th place)

Equestrianism

Fencing

20 fencers, 15 men and 5 women represented France in 1992.

Men's foil
 Philippe Omnès
 Patrick Groc
 Patrice Lhôtellier

Men's team foil
 Patrick Groc, Youssef Hocine, Olivier Lambert, Patrice Lhôtellier, Philippe Omnès

Men's épée
 Éric Srecki
 Jean-Michel Henry
 Olivier Lenglet

Men's team épée
 Éric Srecki, Jean-Michel Henry, Olivier Lenglet, Jean-François Di Martino, Robert Leroux

Men's sabre
 Jean-François Lamour
 Jean-Philippe Daurelle
 Franck Ducheix

Men's team sabre
 Jean-François Lamour, Jean-Philippe Daurelle, Franck Ducheix, Hervé Granger-Veyron, Pierre Guichot

Women's foil
 Laurence Modaine-Cessac
 Isabelle Spennato
 Gisèle Meygret

Women's team foil
 Camille Couzi, Gisèle Meygret, Laurence Modaine-Cessac, Julie-Anne Gross, Isabelle Spennato

Gymnastics

Handball

Men's team competition
Preliminary round (group B)
 France — Spain 18-16
 France — Unified Team 22-23
 France — Germany 23-20
 France — Romania 26-20
 France — Egypt 22-19
Semi Finals
 France — Sweden 22-25
Bronze Medal Match
 France — Iceland 24-20 (→  Bronze Medal)
Team roster
Philippe Debureau
Philippe Gardent
Denis Lathoud
Pascal Mahé
Philippe Médard
Gaël Monthurel
Laurent Munier
Frédéric Perez
Thierry Perreux
Alain Portes
Éric Quintin
Jackson Richardson
Stéphane Stoecklin
Jean-Luc Thiébaut
Denis Tristant
Frédéric Volle
Head coach: Daniel Costantini

Judo

Modern pentathlon

Three male pentathletes represented France in 1992.

Individual
 Sébastien Deleigne
 Joël Bouzou
 Christophe Ruer

Team
 Sébastien Deleigne
 Joël Bouzou
 Christophe Ruer

Rhythmic gymnastics

Rowing

Sailing

Men's Sailboard (Lechner A-390)
Franck David
 Final Ranking — 70.7 points (→  Gold Medal)

Women's Sailboard (Lechner A-390)
Maud Herbert
 Final Ranking — 78.0 points (→ 4th place)

Women's 470 Class
Florence Le Brun and Odile Barre
 Final Ranking — 65.7 points (→ 6th place)

Shooting

Swimming

Men's 50 m Freestyle
 Christophe Kalfayan
 Heat — 22.70
 Final — 22.50 (→ 4th place)
 Stéphan Caron
 Heat — 23.01
 B-Final — DNS (→ no ranking)

Men's 100 m Freestyle
 Stéphan Caron
 Heat — 49.82
 Final — 49.50 (→  Bronze Medal)
 Christophe Kalfayan
 Heat — 50.30
 B-Final — 50.49 (→ 11th place)

Men's 400 m Freestyle
 Christophe Marchand
 Heat — 3:54.59
 B-Final — 3:53.24 (→ 13th place)
 Yann DeFabrique
 Heat — 3:55.66
 B-Final — 3:54.37 (→ 14th place)

Men's 1500 m Freestyle
 Christophe Marchand
 Heat — 15:30.51 (→ did not advance, 14th place)

Men's 100 m Backstroke
 Franck Schott
 Heat — 55.84
 Final — 55.72 (→ 6th place)
 David Holderbach
 Heat — 58.25 (→ did not advance, 36th place)

Men's 200 m Backstroke
 David Holderbach
 Heat — 2:03.11 (→ did not advance, 22nd place)

Men's 100 m Breaststroke
 Stéphane Vossart
 Heat — 1:02.81
 B-Final — 1:02.39 (→ 10th place)
 Christophe Bourdon
 Heat — 1:04.43 (→ did not advance, 31st place)

Men's 200 m Breaststroke
 Stéphane Vossart
 Heat — 2:15.11
 B-Final — 2:15.52 (→ 10th place)
 Christophe Bourdon
 Heat — 2:17.68 (→ did not advance, 21st place)

Men's 100 m Butterfly
 Bruno Gutzeit
 Heat — 54.35
 B-Final — 54.80 (→ 11th place)
 Franck Esposito
 Heat — 55.26 (→ did not advance, 22nd place)

Men's 100 m Butterfly
 Franck Esposito
 Heat — 1:58.75
 Final — 1:58.51 (→  Bronze Medal)
 Christophe Bordeau
 Heat — 2:01.99 (→ did not advance, 25th place)

Men's 200 m Individual Medley
 Frédéric Lefevre
 Heat — 2:03.82
 B-Final — 2:04.05 (→ 12th place)

Men's 4 × 100 m Freestyle Relay
 Stéphan Caron, Frédéric Lefevre, Ludovic Depickère, Bruno Gutzeit, Franck Schott, and Christophe Kalfayan
 Heat — 3:22.01
 Final — 3:19.16 (→ 4th place)

Men's 4 × 200 m Freestyle Relay
 Christophe Bordeau, Lionel Poirot, Franck Horter, and Yann DeFabrique
 Heat — 7:26.22 (→ did not advance, 10th place)

Men's 4 × 100 m Medley Relay
 Franck Schott, Stéphane Vossart, Franck Esposito, Christophe Kalfayan, Bruno Gutzeit, and Stéphan Caron
 Heat — 3:43.13
 Final — 3:40.51 (→ 5th place)

Women's 50 m Freestyle
 Catherine Plewinski
 Heat — 25.78
 Final — 25.36 (→ 4th place)
 Julie Blaise
 Heat — 26.48 (→ did not advance, 17th place)

Women's 100 m Freestyle
 Catherine Plewinski
 Heat — 55.44
 Final — 55.72 (→ 5th place)

Women's 200 m Freestyle
 Catherine Plewinski
 Heat — 2:00.67
 Final — 1:59.88 (→ 4th place)

Women's 100 m Backstroke
 Céline Bonnet
 Heat — 1:05.75 (→ did not advance, 32nd place)
 Diane Lacombe
 Heat — 1:06.31 (→ did not advance, 38th place)

Women's 100 m Breaststroke
 Audrey Guerit
 Heat — 1:13.98 (→ did not advance, 30th place)

Women's 200 m Breaststroke
 Audrey Guerit
 Heat — 2:32.33
 B-Final — 2:32.10 (→ 11th place)

Women's 100 m Butterfly
 Catherine Plewinski
 Heat — 1:00.03
 Final — 59.01 (→  Bronze Medal)
 Jacqueline Delord
 Heat — 1:01.78
 B-Final — 1:03.22 (→ 16th place)

Women's 200 m Butterfly
 Cécile Jeanson
 Heat — 2:13.23
 B-Final — 2:13.40 (→ 10th place)

Women's 200 m Individual Medley
 Céline Bonnet
 Heat — 2:18.95
 B-Final — 2:19.14 (→ 14th place)

Women's 400 m Individual Medley
 Céline Bonnet
 Heat — 4:54.70 (→ did not advance, 19th place)

Women's 4 × 100 m Freestyle Relay
 Julie Blaise, Julia Reggiany, Marie-Laure Giraudon, and Veronique Jardin
 Heat — 3:50.22 (→ did not advance, 11th place)

Women's 4 × 100 m Medley Relay
 Céline Bonnet, Audrey Guerit, Jacqueline Delord, and Julie Blaise
 Heat — 4:21.19 (→ did not advance, 14th place)

Synchronized swimming

Three synchronized swimmers represented France in 1992.

Women's solo
 Anne Capron
 Marianne Aeschbacher
 Karine Schuler

Women's duet
 Anne Capron
 Marianne Aeschbacher

Table tennis

Tennis

Men's Singles Competition
 Guy Forget
 First round — Defeated Cristiano Caratti (Italy) 6-3, 6-4, 6-2
 Second round — Lost to Magnus Larsson (Sweden) 3-6, 3-6, 1-6
 Fabrice Santoro
 First round — Defeated Christian Miniussi (Argentina) 6-1, 7-6, 6-4
 Second round — Defeated Javier Frana (Argentina) 4-6, 6-2, 6-1, 6-1
 Third round — Defeated Boris Becker (Germany) 6-1, 3-6, 6-1, 6-3
 Quarterfinals — Lost to Goran Ivanišević (Croatia) 7-6, 7-6, 4-6, 4-6, 6-8

Men's Doubles Competition
 Guy Forget and Henri Leconte 
 First round — Defeated Emanuel Couto and Bernardo Mota (Portugal) 6-1, 6-3, 6-1
 Second round — Lost to Javier Frana and Christian Miniussi (Argentina) 6-4, 7-6, 4-6, 4-6, 3-6

Volleyball

Men's team competition
Team roster
Rivo Andriamamonjy
Eric Bouvier
Laurent Chambertin
Arnaud Josserand 
Olivier Lecat 
Luc Marquet
Christophe Meneau
David Romann
Olivier Rossard
Philippe Salvan
Laurent Tillie
Eric Wolfer

Water polo

Men's team competition
Preliminary round (group A)
 Tied with Germany (7-7)
 Lost to Australia (5-8)
 Lost to United States (7-11)
 Defeated Czechoslovakia (14-6)
 Lost to Unified Team (5-9)
Classification Matches
 Lost to Greece (6-10)
 Lost to the Netherlands (8-15) → 11th place
Team roster
 Thierry Alimondo 
 Pierre Garsau 
 Nicolas Jeleff 
 François Besson 
 Emmanuel Charlot 
 Vincent De Nardi 
 Emmanuel Ducher 
 Christophe Gautier 
 Christian Grimaldi 
 Pascal Lousteanu 
 Gilles Madelenat 
 Jean-Marie Olivon
 Patrice Tillie

Weightlifting

First-heavyweight 90–100 kg
 Francis Tournefier — 4th place, 387.5 kg (170.0 kg/ 217.5 kg)

Wrestling

References

Nations at the 1992 Summer Olympics
1992
Summer Olympics